Aun the Old (Old Norse Aunn inn gamli, Latinized Auchun, Proto-Norse *Audawiniʀ: English: "Edwin the Old") is a mythical Swedish king of the House of Yngling in the Heimskringla.
Aun was the son of Jorund, and had ten sons, nine of which he was said to have sacrificed in order to prolong his own life. Based on the internal chronology of the House of Yngling, Aun would have died late in the fifth century.
He was succeeded by his son Egil Vendelcrow (Íslendingabók: Egill Vendilkráka)
identified with Ongentheow of the Beowulf narrative and placed in the early sixth century.

Ynglingatal
Ruling from his seat in Uppsala, Aun was reputedly a wise king who made sacrifices to the gods. However, he was not of a warlike disposition and preferred to live in peace. He was attacked and defeated by the Danish prince Halfdan. Aun fled to the Geats in Västergötland, where he stayed for 25 years until Halfdan died in his bed in Uppsala.

Upon Halfdan's death Aun returned to Uppsala. Aun was now 60 years old, and in an attempt to live longer he sacrificed his son to Odin, who had promised that this would mean he would live for another 60 years. After 25 years, Aun was attacked by Halfdan's cousin Ale the Strong. Aun lost several battles and had to flee a second time to Västergötland. Ale the Strong ruled in Uppsala for 25 years until he was killed by Starkad the old.

After Ale the Strong's death, Aun once again returned to Uppsala and once again sacrificed a son to Odin; this time Odin told the king that he would remain living as long as he sacrificed a son every ten years and that he had to name one of the Swedish provinces after the number of sons he sacrificed.

When Aun had sacrificed a son for the seventh time, he was so old that he could not walk but had to be carried on a chair. When he had sacrificed a son for the eighth time, he could no longer get out of his bed. When he had sacrificed his ninth son, he was so old that he had to feed, like a little child, by suckling on a horn.

After ten years he wanted to sacrifice his tenth and last son and name the province of Uppsala The Ten Lands. However, the Swedes refused to allow him to make this sacrifice and so he died. He was buried in a mound at Uppsala and succeeded by his last son Egil. 
From that day, dying in bed of old age was called Aun's sickness.

Historia Norwegiæ
The Historia Norwegiæ presents a Latin summary of Ynglingatal, older than Snorri's quotation (continuing after Jorund):

Notes

Primary sources
Ynglingatal
Ynglinga saga (part of the Heimskringla)
Historia Norwegiae

Secondary sources
Nerman, B. Det svenska rikets uppkomst. Stockholm, 1925.

Filicides
Human sacrifice
Mythological kings of Sweden